In telecommunication, a basic exchange telecommunications radio service (BETRS) is a commercial service that can extend telephone service to rural areas by replacing the local loop with radio communications. In the BETRS, non-government ultra high frequency (UHF) and very high frequency (VHF) common carrier and the private radio service frequencies are shared.

External links
Further details by FCC

Telecommunications standards